Prosantorhinus is an extinct genus of rhinoceros from the lower and middle Miocene. The small teleoceratine rhinocerotid was found in western Europe and Asia.

Description 
Posantorhinus was a similarly sized animal to the Sumatran rhinoceros, it stood at around 4'3" (130 cm) at the shoulder and was about 9'6" (290cm) long, weight estimates however are considerably bigger due to its considerably deeper chest.

Posantorhinus ' body plan is stubbier than other rhinoceros', adding to that Posantorhinus 'brachyodont molars it would seem to suggest Posantorhinus led a semiaquatic life, similar to a hippopotamus, possibly feeding on fresh water plants.

The rugged texture at the tip of its snout could suggest the existence of one, maybe two, small horns; however it has been traditionally reconstructed with a fleshy bump.

References

Miocene rhinoceroses
Prehistoric mammals of Europe
Miocene mammals of Europe
Miocene mammals of Asia